The Inline Speed Skating World Championships (World Roller Speed Skating Championships) are inline speed skating competitions sanctioned by World Skate. The World Championships have been held unofficially since 1937 and officially since 1966. their format has changed over the years.

European nations, in particular Italy, have dominated the competition in its first 40 years. The United States have had a stint of dominance during the 1980s, 90s and 2000s. In the 2010s, Colombia has been the dominant force in the championship, winning the general podium throughout the whole decade.

The championship has had many changes, but it has always focused mainly on road and track disciplines. In 1992, the introduction of inline skates caused a major technological impact after decades of using traditional quad skates.

Due to the 2022 Russian invasion of Ukraine, World Skate banned Russian and Belarusian athletes and officials from its competitions, and will not stage any events in Russia or Belarus in 2022.

World Championships

References

External links
Speed Skating at World Skate
 http://www.online-skating.com/events-16693-2017-world-master-inline-speed-skating-marathon-championships-in-aquila-italy.html
 http://www.online-skating.com/events-16498-2016-edition-of-the-world-roller-speed-skating-championships-in-nanjing-china.html  

Annual sporting events
Inline speed skating competitions